Yudh: Astitvachi Ladai is an Indian Marathi language film directed by Rajiv S. Ruia. The film stars Rajesh Shringarpure , Tejaswini Pandit and Kranti Redkar  Music by Vivek Kar. The film was released on 15th May 2015.

Synopsis 
When Ragini's editor declines to publish a rape case report against a rich businessman, she quits her job and meets police officer Guru Nayak. Learning about her story, Guru decides to help her.

Cast 
 Rajesh Shringarpure as Guru Nayak
 Tejaswini Pandit as Ragini
 Kranti Redkar as Dr. Sarangi
 Pankaj Vishnu as Ujjwal
 Varsha Usgaonkar
 Smita Oak
 Sanjay Kulkarni
 Somnath Tadwalkar
 Sheetal Mantri

Soundtrack

Critical response 
Yudh: Astitvachi Ladai film received negative reviews from critics. Mihir Bhanage of The Times of India gave the film a rating of 2/5 and wrote "To sum it up, Yudh could’ve been a good film but just about manages to be an average one". Ganesh Matkari of Pune Mirror wrote "Ultimately, there is no reason to question the intentions of the film, although it refuses to push the envelope, and ends up delivering a confused and convoluted message". Soumitra Pote of Maharashtra Times gave the film 1 stars out of 5 and wrote "At no level does this film show its solid existence". A reviewer from Loksatta wrote "This Yudh should be called a stray because it did not happen despite having a good scope".

References

External links
 
 

2015 films
2010s Marathi-language films
Indian drama films